Pueblo Lavalleja or Colonia Lavalleja is a village or populated centre in the sparsely populated north part of the Salto Department of northwestern Uruguay. The two populated centres it comprises are called Migliaro and Lluveras.

Colonia Lavalleja is also the name of the municipality to which the village belongs.

Geography

History
On 5 March 1860, it was recognized as "Pueblo" (village) by the Act of Ley Nº 613.

Population
Up to the census of 2004 Pueblo Lavalleja had a population of 1,049. In the 2011 census, Migliaro (733 inh.) and Lluveras (223 inh.) were counted separately adding to a total of 956 inhabitants.
 
Source: Instituto Nacional de Estadística de Uruguay

Places of worship
 St. Joseph Parish Church (Roman Catholic)

References

External links
2004 INE map of Pueblo Lavalleja
2011 INE map of Migliaro
2011 INE map of Lluveras

Populated places in the Salto Department